Ponsonby was launched in 1796 at Liverpool. She initially traded between Liverpool and Dublin, and then between 1801 and 1804 disappeared from Lloyd's Register. She returned to the register in 1805 as she sailed as a privateer for two or so months, capturing two vessels. She then became a slave ship in the triangular trade on enslaved people. The French Navy captured her in late 1804 or early 1805 before she could embark any slaves.

Career
Ponsonby first appeared in Lloyd's Register (LR), in 1797.

Between 1801 and 1804, Ponsonby disappeared from Lloyd's Register. She reappeared in 1805 with new masters, owners, and trades.

Captain Matthew Fiott acquired a letter of marque on 29 June 1805. He sailed Ponsonby as a privateer.

In May 1805 Lloyd's List reported that the privateer Ponsonby, of Liverpool, had detained and sent into Liverpool Fabius, Atkins, master, which had been sailing from Bordeaux to America.

In June Lloyd's List reported that the privateer Ponsonby had detained and sent into Liverpool Young Josias, Jurgens, master. Yong Josias had been on he way from Amsterdam to St Lucars.

After this relatively brief foray into privateering, Ponsonby became a slave ship. Captain John Brown sailed from Liverpool on 7 November 1805, bound for Africa.

Fate

The French put all the captured crews on Active and sent her back to England. The squadron burnt the other vessels that they had captured. The captains arrived at Waterford on 12 May on the cartel Active.

In 1805, 30 British slave ships were lost. In 1806, 33 British slave ships were lost. In 1805, 13 were lost off the coast. In 1806, two  War, not maritime hazards nor slave resistance, was the greatest cause of vessel losses among British slave vessels.

Citations

References

1796 ships
Age of Sail merchant ships of England
Privateer ships of Great Britain
Liverpool slave ships
Captured ships